Paul Nagle (born 29 August 1978) is an Irish rally co-driver. Drivers with whom he has teamed include Kris Meeke, Gareth MacHale and Craig Breen.

Career
Paul Nagle was exposed to rallying from an early age: his father was a national-level co-driver and a key figure in organising events near the family home in Ireland.

Following his rally debut in 1997, Nagle's big break came in 2001 when he became the Peugeot Super Cup champion co-driver, gaining experience of competing in the UK and France in the process. He scored a fine sixth overall alongside Gareth MacHale in Mexico 2006 but a heavy crash in Sardinia the following season curtailed their WRC campaign.

He has co-driven for Kris Meeke since 2009, but without a full-time WRC programme, Nagle kept up his WRC experience by partnering other drivers including Craig Breen in 2012 and Andreas Mikkelsen in 2013. For 2014 Nagle and Meeke will be reunited for a full season at Citroën. After 2018 he was replaced by Sebastian Marshall.

Rally victories

WRC victories

IRC victories

Rally results

WRC results

References

External links
 WRC profile
 Profile at ewrc-results.com

1978 births
Living people
Irish co-drivers
Place of birth missing (living people)
World Rally Championship co-drivers